Anurakthi is a Sanskrit film made in Kerala, India. The film is about the Indian art Koodiyattom.This is the first Sanskrit film to have a song. The song was shot in 3D, making the film the first 3D Sanskrit film. The film was screened at the 48th International Film Festival of India (IFFI), Goa in 2017. The film also won special jury award for best regional film at the 5th Rajasthan International Film Festival (RIFF), Jaipur in 2018.

Plot
The film revolves around a Punjabi danseuse (Vani Vashishth) who arrives in Kerala to learn the ancient dance form Koodiyattam from a master (Kalamandalam Sivan Namboodiri). The master's son falls in love with the danseuse, and later mistakes the relationship between his father and the student.

Cast
Kalamandalam Sivan Namboodiri
Vani Vashishth
Sreehari Attoor
Vijith Nambiar
Sanju Madhav
Bindu Jayan

References

External links
 

Sanskrit-language films
2017 films
Indian dance films
Indian 3D films
Koodiyattam
Films shot in Thrissur